The prime minister of Canada is the head of government of Canada. Under the Westminster system, the prime minister governs with the confidence of a majority of the elected House of Commons; as such, the prime minister typically sits as a member of Parliament (MP) and leads the largest party or a coalition of parties. The prime minister is "called upon"  by the monarch's representative, the governor general, and, as first minister, selects other ministers to form the Cabinet and chairs it. Constitutionally, the Crown exercises executive power on the advice of the Cabinet, which is collectively responsible to the House of Commons. 

Not outlined in any constitutional document, the office exists only per long-established convention (originating in Canada's former colonial power, the United Kingdom) that stipulates the monarch's representative, the governor general, must select as prime minister the person most likely to command the confidence of the elected House of Commons; this individual is typically the leader of the political party that holds the largest number of seats in that chamber. Canadian prime ministers are appointed to the Privy Council and styled as the Right Honourable, a privilege maintained for life.

The prime minister is supported by the Prime Minister's Office and heads the Privy Council Office. The prime minister also selects individuals for appointment as governor general (in the federal jurisdiction) and lieutenant governor (in the provinces), as well as to the Senate of Canada, Supreme Court of Canada, and other federal courts, and, as required under law, the chairs and boards of various Crown corporations. Under the Constitution Act, 1867, government power is vested in the monarch (who is the head of state), but in practice the roles of the monarch and the governor general (or the administrator) are largely ceremonial and only exercised on the advice of a Cabinet minister.

Since Confederation in 1867, 23 prime ministers have formed 29 Canadian Ministries. Justin Trudeau is the current prime minister, who took office on November 4, 2015, following the 2015 federal election where his Liberal Party won a majority of seats. Trudeau's Liberals were subsequently re-elected following the 2019 and 2021 elections with a minority of seats.  Trudeau continued in office with minority governments.

Origin of the office 
The position of prime minister is not outlined in any Canadian constitutional document and is mentioned only in a few sections of the Constitution Act, 1982, and the Letters Patent, 1947 issued by King George VI. The office and its functions are instead governed by constitutional conventions and modelled on the same office in the United Kingdom.

Qualifications and selection 
The prime minister, along with the other ministers in Cabinet, is appointed by the governor general on behalf of the monarch. However, by the conventions of responsible government, designed to maintain administrative stability, the governor general will call to form a government the individual most likely to receive the support, or confidence, of a majority of the directly elected members of the House of Commons; as a practical matter, this is often the leader of a party whose members form a majority, or a very large plurality, of the House of Commons.

While there is no legal requirement for prime ministers to be MPs themselves, for practical and political reasons the prime minister is expected to win a seat very promptly. However, in rare circumstances individuals who are not sitting members of the House of Commons have been appointed to the position of prime minister. Two former prime ministers—John Joseph Caldwell Abbott and Mackenzie Bowell—served in the 1890s while members of the Senate. Both, in their roles as Government Leader in the Senate, succeeded prime ministers who had died in office—John A. Macdonald in 1891 and John Sparrow David Thompson in 1894.

Prime ministers who are not MPs upon their appointment (or who lose their seats while in office) have since been expected to seek election to the House of Commons as soon as possible. For example, William Lyon Mackenzie King, after losing his seat in the 1925 federal election (that his party won), briefly governed without a seat in the House of Commons before winning a by-election a few weeks later. Similarly, John Turner replaced Pierre Trudeau as leader of the Liberal Party in 1984 and subsequently was appointed prime minister while not holding a seat in the House of Commons; Turner won a riding in the next election but the Liberal Party was swept from power.

When a prime minister loses their seat in the legislature, or should a new prime minister be appointed without holding a seat, the typical process that follows is that a member in the governing political party will resign to allow the prime minister to run in the resulting by-election. A safe seat is usually chosen; while the Liberal and Conservative parties generally observed a practice of not running a candidate against another party's new leader in the by-election, the New Democratic Party and smaller political parties typically do not follow the same practice. However, if the governing party selects a new leader shortly before an election is due, and that new leader is not a member of the legislature, they will normally await the upcoming election before running for a seat in Parliament.

Term of office 

The prime minister serves at  Majesty's pleasure, meaning the post does not have a fixed term, and once appointed and sworn in by the governor general, the prime minister remains in office until they resign, are dismissed, or die. 

While the lifespan of a parliament is constitutionally limited to five years, a 2007 amendment to the Canada Elections Act, Section 56.1(2) limited the term of a majority government to four years, with election day being set as the third Monday in October of the fourth calendar year after the previous polling date. The governor general may still, on the advice of the prime minister, dissolve parliament and issue the writs of election prior to the date mandated by the constitution or Canada Elections Act; the King–Byng Affair was the only time since Confederation that the governor general refused the prime minister's request for a general vote.

Following parliamentary dissolution, the prime minister must run in the resulting general election to maintain a seat in the House of Commons. Should the prime minister's party subsequently win a majority of seats in the House of Commons, it is unnecessary to re-appoint the prime minister or for the prime minister to retake the oath of office. If, however, an opposition party wins a majority of seats, the prime minister may resign or be dismissed by the governor general. Should the prime minister's party achieve a minority while an opposition party wins a plurality (i.e., more seats than any other party but less than a majority), the prime minister can attempt to maintain the confidence of the House by forming a coalition with other minority parties, which was last entertained in 1925 or by entering into a confidence-and-supply agreement.

Role and authority

Because the prime minister is in practice the most politically powerful member of the Canadian government, they are sometimes erroneously referred to as Canada's head of state, when, in fact, that role belongs to the Canadian monarch, represented by the governor general. The prime minister is, instead, the head of government and is responsible for advising the Crown on how to exercise much of the royal prerogative and its executive powers, which are governed by the constitution and its conventions. However, the function of the prime minister has evolved with increasing power. Today, per the doctrines of constitutional monarchy, the advice given by the prime minister is ordinarily binding, meaning the prime minister effectively carries out those duties ascribed to the sovereign or governor general, leaving the latter to act in predominantly ceremonial fashions. As such, the prime minister, supported by the Office of the Prime Minister (PMO), controls the appointments of many key figures in Canada's system of governance, including the governor general, the Cabinet, justices of the Supreme Court, senators, heads of Crown corporations, ambassadors and high commissioners, the provincial lieutenant governors, and approximately 3,100 other positions. Further, the prime minister plays a prominent role in the legislative process—with the majority of bills put before Parliament originating in the Cabinet—and the leadership of the Canadian Armed Forces.

Pierre Trudeau is credited with, throughout his tenure as prime minister between 1968 and 1984, consolidating power in the PMO, which is itself filled by political and administrative staff selected at the prime minister's discretion and unaccountable to Parliament. At the end of the 20th century and into the 21st, analysts—such as Jeffrey Simpson, Donald Savoie, Andrew Coyne, and John Gomery—argued that both Parliament and the Cabinet had become eclipsed by prime ministerial power; Savoie wrote: "The Canadian prime minister has little in the way of institutional check, at least inside government, to inhibit his ability to have his way." Indeed, the position has been described as undergoing a "presidentialization", to the point that its incumbents publicly outshine the actual head of state (and prime minister's spouses are sometimes referred to as First Lady of Canada). Former governor general Adrienne Clarkson alluded to what she saw as "an unspoken rivalry" that had developed between the prime minister and the Crown. It has been theorized that such is the case in Canada as its Parliament is less influential on the executive than in other countries with Westminster parliamentary systems; particularly, Canada has fewer MPs, a higher turnover rate of MPs after each election, and a US-style system for selecting political party leaders, leaving them accountable to the party membership rather than caucus (as is the case in the UK).

There do exist checks on the prime minister's power: the House of Commons may revoke its confidence in an incumbent prime minister and Cabinet or caucus revolts can quickly bring down a serving premier and even mere threats of such action can persuade or compel a prime minister to resign his post, as happened with Jean Chrétien. The Reform Act, 2014, codifies the process by which a caucus may trigger a party leadership review and, if necessary, chose an interim leader, thereby making a prime minister more accountable to the MPs in his or her party. Caucuses may choose to follow these rules, though the decision would be made by recorded vote, thereby subjecting the party's choice to public scrutiny.

The Senate may delay or impede legislation put forward by the Cabinet, such as when Brian Mulroney's bill creating the Goods and Services Tax (GST) came before the Senate, and given Canada's federal nature, the jurisdiction of the federal government is limited to areas prescribed by the constitution. Further, as executive power is constitutionally vested in the monarch, meaning the royal prerogative belongs to the Crown and not to any of its ministers, the sovereign's supremacy over the prime minister in the constitutional order is thus seen as a "rebuff to the pretensions of the elected: As it has been said, when the prime minister bows before the queen, he bows before us [the Canadian people]." Either the sovereign or his or her governor general may therefore oppose the prime minister's will in extreme, crisis situations. Near the end of her time as governor general, Adrienne Clarkson stated: "My constitutional role has lain in what are called 'reserve powers': making sure that there is a prime minister and a government in place, and exercising the right 'to encourage, to advise, and to warn'[...] Without really revealing any secrets, I can tell you that I have done all three."

Privileges

Two official residences are provided to the prime minister—24 Sussex Drive in Ottawa and Harrington Lake, a country retreat in Gatineau Park—as well an office in the Office of the Prime Minister and Privy Council building (formerly known as Langevin Block), across from Parliament Hill. For transportation, the prime minister is afforded an armoured car (a car allowance of $2,000 per year) and shared use of two official aircraft—a CC-150 Polaris for international flights and a Challenger 601 for domestic trips. The Royal Canadian Mounted Police also furnish constant personal security for the prime minister and their family. All of the aforementioned is provided through budgets approved by Parliament, as is the prime minister's total annual compensation of $357,800 (consisting of an MP's salary of $178,900 and the prime minister's salary of $178,900).

Serving or former prime ministers are accorded a state funeral, wherein their casket lies in state in the Centre Block of Parliament Hill. Only Bowell and the Viscount Bennett were given private funerals, Bennett also being the only former prime minister of Canada to die and be buried outside the country and Bowell the only whose funeral was not attended by politicians. John Thompson also died outside Canada, at Windsor Castle, where Queen Victoria permitted his lying-in-state before his body was returned to Canada for a state funeral in Halifax.

Prior to 1919, it was traditional for the monarch to bestow a knighthood on newly appointed Canadian prime ministers. Accordingly, several carried the prefix Sir before their name; of the first eight premiers of Canada, only Alexander Mackenzie refused the honour of a knighthood from Queen Victoria. Following the 1919 Nickle Resolution, however, the House of Commons motioned that it should be against the policy of the Canadian Sovereign (and the Canadian government advising the Monarch when such honours are not within the Monarch's personal gift) to bestow aristocratic or chivalric titles to Canadians. The Crown in right of Canada (but not the Crown in right of the United Kingdom, which has periodically bestowed such Imperial honours on such citizens) has since adopted this policy generally, such that the last prime minister to be knighted near appointment was Robert Borden, who was the prime minister at the time the Nickle Resolution was debated in the House of Commons (and was knighted before the resolution). Still, Bennett was, in 1941, six years after he stepped down as prime minister, elevated to the peerage of the United Kingdom by King George VI as Viscount Bennett, of Mickleham in the County of Surrey and of Calgary and Hopewell in Canada. No prime minister has since been titled.

The Canadian Heraldic Authority (CHA) grants former prime ministers an augmentation of honour on the coat of arms of those who apply for them. The heraldic badge, referred to by the CHA as the mark of the Prime Ministership of Canada, consists of four red maple leaves joined at the stem on a white field (Argent four maple leaves conjoined in cross at the stem Gules); the augmentation is usually a canton or centred in the chief. Joe Clark, Pierre Trudeau, John Turner, Brian Mulroney, Kim Campbell, Jean Chrétien and Paul Martin were granted arms with the augmentation.

Style of address

Canada continues the Westminster tradition of using the title Prime Minister when one is speaking to the federal head of government directly; the Department of Canadian Heritage advises that it is incorrect to use the term Mr. Prime Minister. The written form of address for the prime minister should use his or her full parliamentary title: The Right Honourable [name], [post-nominal letters], Prime Minister of Canada. However, while in the House of Commons during Question Period, other members of parliament may address the prime minister as the Right Honourable Member for [prime minister's riding] or simply the Right Honourable Prime Minister. Former prime ministers retain the prefix the Right Honourable for the remainder of their lives; should they remain sitting MPs, they may be referred as the Right Honourable Member for [member's riding], by their portfolio title (if appointed to one), as in the Right Honourable Minister of National Defence, or should they become opposition leader, as the Right Honourable Leader of the Opposition.

In the decades following Confederation, it was common practice to refer to the prime minister as Premier of Canada, a custom that continued until the First World War, around the time of Robert Borden's premiership.

Prime minister-designate of Canada

The prime minister–designate of Canada is the person who has been designated as the future prime minister by the governor general, after either the individual's politicial party won a general election or proposing to form either a confidence and supply government or coalition government. The term does not apply to incumbent prime ministers.

Activities post-tenure
After exiting office, former prime ministers of Canada have engaged in various pursuits. Some remained in politics: Bowell continued as a senator, Stephen Harper returned to the House of Commons as a backbench MP, and Bennett moved to the United Kingdom after being elevated to the House of Lords. A number were leaders of the Official Opposition: John A. Macdonald, Arthur Meighen, Mackenzie King, and Pierre Trudeau, all before being re-appointed as prime minister (Mackenzie King twice); Alexander Mackenzie and John Diefenbaker, both prior to sitting as regular Members of Parliament until their deaths; Wilfrid Laurier dying while still in the post; and Charles Tupper, Louis St. Laurent, and John Turner, each before they returned to private business. Meighen was also appointed to the Senate following his second period as prime minister, but resigned his seat to seek re-election and moved to private enterprise after failing to win a riding. Also returning to civilian life were: Robert Borden, who was Chancellor of Queen's and McGill Universities, as well as working in the financial sector; Lester B. Pearson, who was Chancellor of Carleton University; Joe Clark and Kim Campbell, who became university professors, Clark also consultant and Campbell working in international diplomacy and as the director of private companies and chairperson of interest groups; while Pierre Trudeau and Jean Chrétien returned to legal practice. Former prime ministers also commonly penned autobiographies—Tupper, for example—or published their memoirs—such as Diefenbaker and Paul Martin.

See also

 Historical rankings of prime ministers of Canada
 List of prime ministers of Canada by time in office
 Prime ministers of Canada in popular culture
 List of books about prime ministers of Canada
 List of prime ministers of Queen Victoria
 List of prime ministers of Edward VII
 List of prime ministers of George V
 List of prime ministers of Edward VIII
 List of prime ministers of George VI
 List of prime ministers of Elizabeth II
 List of prime ministers of Charles III
Spouse of the prime minister of Canada

Notes

References

Further reading

External links 

 Official government Web site of the Office of the Prime Minister
 Prime Minister of Canada on YouTube
 Library of Parliament of Canada
 Canada's Best Prime Ministers: 2011 Maclean's article

 
Government of Canada
1867 establishments in Canada